Walter K. Lew is a Korean-American poet and scholar.  He has taught creative writing, East Asian literatures, and Asian American literature at Brown University, Cornell University, Mills College, the University of Miami, and UCLA. Aside from the award-winning Treadwinds: Poems and Intermedia Texts, Lew is the author, co-author, or editor of seven books and several special journal issues and artist's books. 
Lew's translations and scholarship on Korean literature and Asian American literature have been widely anthologized and he was the first U.S. artist to revive the art of movietelling (live narration of silent films), beginning in 1982.

Lew was the founding editor of the literary and scholarly press, Kaya Production (1993–96), where he solicited, developed, and published such books as R. Zamora Linmark's Rolling the R's, Kimiko Hahn's Unbearable Heart, Sesshu Foster's City Terrace Field Manual, and a new edition of Younghill Kang's East Goes West: The Making of an Oriental Yankee.

Lew's documentaries and news stories  have been broadcast on CBS News, PBS, British ITV, and NHK-Japan. He has often collaborated with visual artists, such as O Woomi Chung, Ashley Ford, and, most continually, the filmmaker Lewis Klahr.

Lew presently resides in Brooklyn, New York and Bethlehem, Pennsylvania after several years in Seoul and Tokyo.

Works
 SCROTA, with O Woomi Chung, limited edition chapbook, 2014
 WITH EYES CLOSED, with O Woomi Chung, site-specific video installations, 2014
 IMPERATIVES OF CULTURE: Selected Essays on Korean History, Literature, and Society from the Japanese Colonial Era (Ed. with Christopher P. Hanscom and Youngju Ryu), University of Hawai'i Press, 2013
 EST-CE QUE LA LIGNE A ASSASSINE LE CIRCLE?, with Ashley Ford, limited edition artist's book, 2011
 YI WON, a selection of Yi Won's poetry translated by Walter K. Lew and published as a chapbook for the 35th Poetry International Festival, Poetry International, Rotterdam, 2004.
 TREADWINDS: Poems and Intermedia Texts, Wesleyan University Press, 2002
 EXCERPTS FROM: ∆IKTH DIKTE 딕테/딕티 for DICTEE (1982), Yeuleum Sa (Seoul), 1991
 "Pack Observing Art Basel >< Miami Beach 2008," (Ed., with Alan R. Clinton), "Avant-garde as Critical Practice" issue of RECONSTRUCTION 9.2 (2009)
 KÔRI: The Beacon Anthology of Korean American Fiction (Ed., Comment., with Heinz Insu Fenkl), Beacon Press, 2001
 CRAZY MELON and CHINESE APPLE: The Poems of Frances Chung (Ed., Comment.), Wesleyan University Press, 2000
 PREMONITIONS: The Kaya Anthology of New Asian North American Poetry (Ed.), Kaya Production, 1995
 MUAE: A Journal of Transcultural Production (Ed., Trans.), Kaya Production, 1995-1996
 "The Fight for Democracy" (Associate producer), part 8 (Dir. Carl Byker), of the Emmy-award-winning 10-part documentary series The Pacific Century, Prod. Peter Bull and Alex Gibney, 1992. Also awarded an Alfred I. duPont–Columbia University Award.

Awards
 Asian American Literary Award, poetry category, The Asian American Writers' Workshop, 2003
 PEN Center USA Literary Award, finalist, poetry, PEN Center USA, 2002
 Inter-Arts Fellowship, with Lewis Klahr, National Endowment for the Arts, 1990

See also
1995 in poetry

References

Living people
American writers of Korean descent
University of Miami faculty
American poets
20th-century American novelists
21st-century American novelists
American novelists of Asian descent
American male novelists
20th-century American poets
21st-century American poets
American male poets
20th-century American male writers
21st-century American male writers
Novelists from Florida
Year of birth missing (living people)